Two bore or 2 bore is an obsolete firearm caliber.

Specifications 

Two bores generally fire spherical balls or slugs of hardened lead or, in the modern metallic cartridge, additionally a solid bronze projectile.

History and background 

Despite the popularity of the calibre in modern gun lore there is no evidence the 2 bore as named was actually used as a terrestrial and shoulder fired firearm. The equivalent calibre size equates to various punt guns used for harvesting large number of waterfowls usually mounted in 'punts' or flat bottomed boats for commercial purposes.  A common misconception is the hunter Sir Samuel White Baker being attributed to its use, however his firearm 'Baby' as described below was actually close to 3 bore, the firearms records still exist by the maker listing the serial number as 1296. The confusion occurs due to Baker's common reference to the projectile fired from the firearm weighing 'half a pound', which would if a round ball equate to a 2 bore by definition. However Baker himself never refers to this projectile being a round ball nor uses the term 2 bore in any of his writings, indicating this half pound shell was a longer projectile of cylindrical or conical shape.

Schroeder & Hetzendorfer cartridge

See also
 4 bore
 Gauge (bore diameter)
 Holland & Holland

References

 
 

Firearms by caliber
British firearm cartridges